The following television stations operate on virtual channel 64 in the United States:

 K14AT-D in Ridgecrest, California
 K20LH-D in Ridgecrest, California
 KILM in Inglewood, California
 KNWS-LD in Brownsville, Texas
 KTFK-DT in Stockton, California
 KZTE-LD in Fulton, Arkansas
 WAXN-TV in Kannapolis, North Carolina
 WDPB in Seaford, Delaware
 WECN in Naranjito, Puerto Rico
 WLLA in Kalamazoo, Michigan
 WNAC-TV in Providence, Rhode Island
 WQPX-TV in Scranton, Pennsylvania
 WSTR-TV in Cincinnati, Ohio

The following stations, which are no longer licensed, formerly operated on virtual channel 64 in the United States:
 WBOA-CD in Kittanning, Pennsylvania

References

64 virtual